Gray Matters is a science fiction novel by William Hjortsberg.

Plot summary
World War III has devastated most of the world, but life is still good for the lucky (and rich) few hundred persons who had their brains preserved in an automated conservatory.  Although they have no bodies to move around with, they are free to mentally visit any of the other residents, and engage in all the emotional, intellectual and (pseudo-) sexual congress that they desire.

Reception

The book was serialized in Playboy, and won the Playboy Editorial Award.

Release details
 1971, USA, Simon & Schuster (1st Edition)

Notes

1971 American novels
1971 science fiction novels